Banksia sclerophylla is a species of shrub that is endemic to the south-west of Western Australia. It has spreading stems, linear, pinnatipid leaves with triangular lobes on the sides, yellow flowers in heads of between forty and seventy, and elliptical follicles.

Description
There are between ten and thirty triangular lobes on each side of the leaves.

Taxonomy and naming
This species was first formally described in 1855 by Carl Meissner who gave it the name Dryandra sclerophylla and published the description in Hooker's Journal of Botany and Kew Garden Miscellany from specimens collected by James Drummond. The specific epithet (sclerophylla) is from ancient Greek word-elements meaning "hard" and "-leaved".

In 2007 Austin Mast and Kevin Thiele transferred all dryandras to the genus Banksia and renamed this species Banksia sclerophylla.

Distribution and habitat
Banksia sclerophylla grows in kwongan between the Alexander Morrison National Park, Mount Lesueur and Badgingarra.

Conservation status
This banksia is classified as "not threatened" by the Western Australian Government Department of Parks and Wildlife.

References

 

sclerophylla
Taxa named by Carl Meissner
Plants described in 1855